Sandesaya (Sinhalese language word meaning The Message) is a 1960 film. The film based on the war between the Sinhalese people and the Portuguese invaders in Sri Lanka. It was directed by Sri Lankan film director Lester James Peries. It was produced by K. Gunaratnam on behalf of the Cinemas Company on the request of Raj Kapoor.

Plot
A band of guerrillas led by Bandara (Ananda Jayaratne) lead a resistance against Portuguese invaders. Bandara is in love with Sumana (Kanthi Gunatunga).

Cast
 Ananda Jayaratne as Bandara
 Kanthi Gunatunga as Sumana
 Gamini Fonseka as Dhamitha
 David Dharmakeerthi as Disapathi Ekanayake 'Disawa'
 Arthur Van Langenberg as Captain Antony Rodrigo
 Vincent Vaas as Sandeshaya Carrier
 Hugo Fernando as Vithana Rala
 Eddie Jayamanne as Mamma
 Shane Gunaratne as Sira
 Iranganie Serasinghe as Yaso Hami
 Bandu Gunasekara as Punchappu
 Douglas Wickremasinghe as Mudaliwuna Malwana
 Thilakasiri Fernando as Cart driver
 Shanthi Lekha as Executed man's wife
 N. R. Dias as Torturer
 Chris Greet as Portuguese soldier
 Jeevarani Kurukulasuriya as Executed man's daughter
 Reg Van Culenberg as Portuguese soldier
 Tissa Udangamuwa as Portuguese soldier
 Anthony C. Perera as Town crier

Music
The music in the film was composed by R. Muttusamy, a pioneer in Sinhala music. Jothipala's Puruthugeesikaraya was a hit. The lyrics were composed by Arisen Ahubudu.

References

External links
Silumina.lk
Sri Lanka Cinema Database

National Film Corporation of Sri Lanka - Official Website

1960 films
1960 war films
Sinhala-language films
Films directed by Lester James Peries
Films set in the Crisis of the Sixteenth Century
Sinhalese–Portuguese War in film
1960s historical films
Sri Lankan historical films